Batouri Airport  is a public use airport located  north of Batouri, Est, Cameroon.

Gallery

See also
List of airports in Cameroon

References

External links 
 Airport record for Batouri Airport at Landings.com

Airports in Cameroon
East Region (Cameroon)